Brito da Silva Josenildo (born August 23, 1993), known as Nildo, is a Brazilian footballer for Kagoshima United FC.

Club statistics
Updated to 20 February 2018.

References

External links

Profile at Fukushima United FC

1993 births
Living people
Brazilian footballers
J2 League players
J3 League players
Tokyo Verdy players
Hokkaido Consadole Sapporo players
Fukushima United FC players
Kagoshima United FC players
Brazilian expatriate footballers
Expatriate footballers in Japan
Association football midfielders